Svortland or Bremnes is the administrative centre of Bømlo municipality in Vestland county, Norway. The village surrounds the lake Storavatnet. The Norwegian County Road 542 runs through the village.

In addition to municipal services, Svortland is also the location of Bremnes Church, an elementary school, a medical centre, a community centre, and many stores and businesses.

The village was historically named Bremnes after the local church.  There was also a local farm in Bremnes called Sortland, which was also used to refer to the area.  In the 1990s, the municipal council officially named the urban area Svortland.

References

Villages in Vestland
Bømlo